Adela Cantalapiedra (born 22 September 1945) is a Spanish television presenter who has worked primarily on Televisión Española. She was a presenter of its flagship newscast Telediario between 1974 and 1980 and of Informe Semanal between 1980 and 1981.

References

External links

1945 births
Living people
People from Ávila, Spain
Spanish television personalities